Laura Serrant,  (born 1963) is a British nurse and academic. She is currently Regional Head of Nursing for North East and Yorkshire at Health Education England and Professor of at Manchester Metropolitan University where she was previously Head of Department.

Early life and career
Serrant was born in Nottingham in 1963, the daughter of John Serrant and his wife, born Eudora Toussaint. She was not only the first in her family to attend university, but also one of the first nurses to qualify through a degree, graduating in 1986 with a Bachelor of Arts (BA) degree in nursing from Sheffield City Polytechnic.

Serrant's work specialises in sexual and reproductive health, including research into working with sex workers, alcohol and drug dependent individuals and tackling attitudes towards HIV and AIDS alongside policy development nationally and internationally with an emphasis on racial inequalities and cultural safety. In 2016, Serrant appeared in BBC Four documentary Black Nurses: The Women Who Saved the NHS, discussing the contribution and celebrating the influence of Black nurses in the NHS.

In 2017, then Chief Nursing Officer Jane Cummings appointed Serrant as Chair of the BME Strategic Advisory Group for NHS England. Serrant has held a number of posts, having previously been Professor of Community and Public Health Nursing the University of Wolverhampton and Head of Evidence and Strategy in the Nursing Directorate of NHS England. She was also non executive director of Sheffield Health & Social Care NHS Foundation Trust from April 2018 to August 2019. From May 2016 to November 2018 she also served as Professor of Nursing at Sheffield Hallam University.

In 2018 Serrant was appointed as the Head of the School of Nursing at Manchester Metropolitan University becoming the only black head of nursing in UK Universities.

Outside of her work in Nursing, Serrant has appeared on BBC Radio 4 programme Great Lives where she nominated poet and activist Audre Lorde as deserving of the title of having lived a 'Great Life'. Furthermore, her relationship with poetry continued with the inclusion of a poem written by Serrant in a theatre production titled 'Windrush' which toured the UK in 2018.

Honours
In 2014, the Health Service Journal compiled a list of the 50 people from Black & Minority ethnicities working within the NHS that are inspiring and making a difference and included Serrant for her work in community and public health nursing at the University of Wolverhampton.

In 2017 it was announced that Serrant was recognised in the 2018 Powerlist as the eighth most influential black person in the United Kingdom, and in the same year she was awarded an honorary doctorate by Abertay University.

In the 2018 Queen's Birthday Honours, she was appointed an Officer of the Order of the British Empire (OBE) for services to health policy. Serrant has also been included on the 2019, 2020 and 2021 Powerlist of the 100 most influential Britons of African/African Caribbean descent in recognition of her contribution to medicine.

In 2021 she received the Prestigious Nursing Times UK Chief Nursing Officers' Lifetime Achievement award fir services the Nursing.

Selected works

References

External links
 NHS Profile
 Manchester Metropolitan University Profile
 Publications at Google Scholar
 

Living people
English nurses
Nursing researchers
British women nurses
Academics of Sheffield Hallam University
Academics of the University of Wolverhampton
Alumni of Sheffield Hallam University
Officers of the Order of the British Empire
Black British women academics
Black British people in health professions
1963 births